Ken or Kenneth Rowe may refer to:

Ken Rowe (baseball)
Ken Rowe (footballer)
Kenneth Rowe (North Korean defector), fighter pilot originally called No Kum-Sok
Kenneth Rowe (philatelist)
Kenneth Thorpe Rowe, English professor